Sebastian Salas (born October 2, 1987) is a Canadian former professional road racing cyclist who started his career in 2011 with . He switched to  the following year. He distinguished himself in the 2012 Tour of California by winning the King of the Mountains competition, which he led from the third stage until the end of the eight stage race.  Starting in 2014, Salas served a two-year doping violation ban issued by the Canadian Centre for Ethics in Sport for missing a 2013 in-competition doping test.

Major results

2011
 7th National Road Race Championships
2012
 6th National Road Race Championships
 Tour of California
1st  Mountains classification
 6th Overall Tour of the Gila
 9th Overall Tour de Beauce

References

External links

Cyclingbase profile for Sebastian Salas

1987 births
Canadian male cyclists
Living people
Sportspeople from Vancouver